The International Hockey League was a professional hockey league operating in Canada and the United States from 1929 to 1936. It is one of two direct ancestors of the American Hockey League.

It was formed when the Canadian Professional Hockey League split into two leagues. The larger teams formed the IHL, which was one step below the National Hockey League. The smaller teams kept the CPHL name, and served as a farm system for the IHL for one season.

Three teams folded and two others merged after the 1935–36 season, leaving the IHL with only four teams—the minimum required for the league to be viable. The remaining teams joined with the Canadian-American Hockey League, which had also been cut down to four teams, to form a "circuit of mutual convenience" called the "International-American Hockey League."  The two leagues played an interlocking schedule for the next two years, with the IHL serving as the IAHL's  Western Division and the Can-Am serving as its Eastern Division. The Buffalo Bisons, a charter IHL member, suspended operations due to an arena collapse and subsequent financial problems after only 11 games, and the IAHL played as a seven-team unit for the rest of the season and all of the 1938–39 season.

At a meeting held in New York City on June 28, 1938, the two leagues formally merged into a unified league operating under the IAHL name. The Eastern Amateur Hockey League's Hershey Bears were added as an expansion team, replacing the Bisons. The IAHL changed its name to the American Hockey League in 1940.

Teams

See also
List of ice hockey leagues

References

External links
 International Hockey League (1929-1936) at HockeyDB
 International Hockey League (1929-1936) at hockeyleaguehistory.com
 International Hockey League (1929-1936) at ottawavalleyonline.com

 
Defunct ice hockey leagues in the United States
Defunct ice hockey leagues in Canada
Sports leagues established in 1929
Sports leagues disestablished in 1936